Sikory  is a village in the administrative district of Gmina Czaplinek, within Drawsko County, West Pomeranian Voivodeship, in north-western Poland.

Before 1772 the area was part of Kingdom of Poland, 1772-1945 Prussia and Germany, before returning to Poland. It was a royal village of the Polish Crown. For more on its history, see Drahim County. 

The historic stone church of St. Stanislaus is located in the village.

References

Sikory